Fotballklubben Bergen Nord is a Norwegian association football club from Salhus, Åsane, Hordaland.

It was established in 1988 when the football section split from IL Norna-Salhus and Hordvik IL.

The men's football team was relegated from the Third Division, the fourth tier of Norwegian football, after the 2012 season.

References

External links
 Official site 

Football clubs in Norway
Sport in Bergen
Association football clubs established in 1988
1988 establishments in Norway